Brosdale Island is an uninhabited island in the council area of Argyll and Bute, Scotland. It is 1.25 miles from Jura House on Jura. It is about 1/4 of a mile long and 1/4 of a mile wide.

The earliest comprehensive written list of Hebridean island names was undertaken in the 16th century by Donald Monro in his 16th century Description of the Western Isles of Scotland. Brosdale is not mentioned by name although there is a laconic entry referring to a Hasil Iyle "which in the Erish is callit Ellan-na-Crawiche". R. W. Munro was unable to identify the location of Hasil Iyle but writing 40 years later Peter Youngson suggested that Monro was referring to Brosdale. He did not offer a specific explanation for his identification although Brosdale does lie between Am Fraoch Eilean to the west and Eilean nan Gabhar in the Small Isles of Jura to the north which are more readily identifiable.  However, Matheson suggests that Monro's "Ellan charn" may be Brosdale Island.

Etymology
Youngson simply notes that "this beautiful island seems to have had various different names during its history". Matheson, as evidence for his idea that Brosdale is Ellan charn, states that it "appears on an old map as Chreig Yl.?" and mentions that the modern name has "obviously been re-named after Brosdale on the mainland of Jura opposite". 'Brosdale' is clearly Norse in origin, dalr meaning valley. 'Bros' is harder to interpret but may be from brok, meaning "bad, black grass". Hasil Iyle/Ellan-na-Crawiche suggests a wooded island, whereas Monipennie suggests that Ellan charn takes its name "from a cairne of stones".

Notes

Footnotes

References 
 Gillies, H. Cameron (1906) The Place-Names of Argyll. David Nutt. London.
 
 Matheson, Angus (April 1963) "Review of Monro's Western Isles of Scotland and Genealogies of the Clans, 1549 by R. W. Munro". The Scottish Historical Review. 42 No. 133, Part 1 pp. 48–51. Edinburgh. Edinburgh University Press/JSTOR.
 Monipennie, John (1818) An Abridgement, or Summarie of the Chronicles of Scotland with a Briefe description of Scotland, to which is added The description of the Western Isles of Scotland &c. Edinburgh. David Webster. Probably first published 1612. (Appended to Memoirs of the Lord Viscount Dundee. (1818) Edinburgh, by Google Books.)
Monro, Sir Donald (1549) A Description Of The Western Isles of Scotland. Appin Regiment/Appin Historical Society. Retrieved 3 March 2007. First published in by William Auld, Edinburgh 1774.
 Munro, R. W. (1961) Monro's Western Isles of Scotland and Genealogies of the Clans. Edinburgh and London. Oliver and Boyd.
 Youngson, Peter (2001) Jura: Island of Deer. Edinburgh. Birlinn.

External links
 

Uninhabited islands of Argyll and Bute